Aruhan Galieva (born August 1991) is a British-Kazakh actress, musician, comedian, and climate activist. She is known for her work as a solo soprano on Karl Jenkins' Tlep under Sony BMG and her work on the follow-up album Shakarim which was premiered at the Royal Festival Hall.

In 2012, she appeared in Joe Wright's film adaptation of Anna Karenina. In 2015, she made her professional theatre debut at The Globe as Blanche of Castile in James Dacre's production of King John. In 2016, she appeared in "Men Against Fire", an episode of the anthology series Black Mirror. From 2017 to 2018, she appeared in the BBC soap opera Doctors as Besa Kotti. In 2020, she appeared in "Can You Hear Me", the seventh episode for the twelfth series of Doctor Who.

Early life
Galieva was born in Leeds, Yorkshire to Kazakh violinist Marat Bisengaliev and British flutist Stine Wilson. She began singing as a child and worked with Karl Jenkins, performing from the age of 11. She attended the King's School, Canterbury Marlowe from 2005 to 2010 as a member of the house Marlowe. She was a music scholar and chorister at school. Galieva joined the National Youth Theatre's REP Company.

Filmography

Stage

References

External links
 
 
 

Living people
1991 births
21st-century British women singers
Actresses from Leeds
British actresses of Asian descent
British people of Kazakh descent
Climate activists
Comedians from Yorkshire
English child singers
English Shakespearean actresses
English women comedians
Green Party of England and Wales people
Musicians from Leeds
National Youth Theatre members
People educated at The King's School, Canterbury
Place of birth missing (living people)